Medway Public Schools is a public school district in Norfolk County, Massachusetts, United States, based in Medway, Massachusetts.

Schools
Medway Public Schools has two elementary schools, one middle school, and one high school.

Elementary schools 
Burke-Memorial School
McGovern School

Middle school
Medway Middle School

High school
Medway High School

References

External links
Medway Public Schools

Education in Norfolk County, Massachusetts
School districts in Massachusetts
Medway, Massachusetts